Berkeley Mill Village is a historic district encompassing the mill village of Berkeley in Cumberland, Rhode Island.  The village is roughly bounded by Martin Street and Mendon Road on the north and east, railroad tracks to the west, and St. Joseph Cemetery to the south.  The village, including a mill complex and mill employee housing, was built in 1872 by the Lonsdale Company.  Most of the residential structures built are two-story brick duplexes, although Mendon Street is lined with a number of fine Queen Anne Victorian houses.  A c. 1892 Stick-style church building (now used for non-religious purposes), stands on Mendon Street at the northern end of the district.

The district was added to the National Register of Historic Places in 1972.

See also
National Register of Historic Places listings in Providence County, Rhode Island

References

Populated places in Providence County, Rhode Island
Buildings and structures in Cumberland, Rhode Island
Historic districts in Providence County, Rhode Island
Historic districts on the National Register of Historic Places in Rhode Island
National Register of Historic Places in Providence County, Rhode Island